The following is a list of television stations that are either affiliated or owned-and-operated by GMA Network.

Free-to-air television stations

Analog

Digital terrestrial

See also 
 List of Philippine television networks
 List of Philippine media companies

References 

 
GMA Network (company)
Philippine television-related lists